The Fake Leather Blues Band is a blues band from Pretoria, South Africa. They are also commonly known simply as FLBB.

Band history
The band was formed in May 2003 during a jam session with  Conrad Jamneck, Peter Toussaint, Franco Jamneck and Gideon Meintjies.

Over the years the band has had different drummers and rhythm guitar players. In the meantime, FLBB played the Oppikoppi festival several times, as well as other festivals such as the Up the Creek festival and the Strab and FORR festivals in Mozambique.  the band has not released any albums, but they have filmed concerts that can be found on YouTube.

Band members

Conrad Jamneck – vocals
Peter Toussaint – lead guitar and back-up vocals
Franco Jamneck – bass and back-up vocals
Wim van Vuuren – drums
Pedro Barbosa – rhythm guitar

References

Blues musical groups
Musical groups established in 2003